The White Abacus is a 1997 science fiction novel by Damien Broderick. It follows the story of Telmah Lord Cima who travels to Earth from a far-off world and becomes friends with a computer-augmented being called Ratio.

Background
The White Abacus was first published in the United States in March 1997 by Avon Eos in hardback and trade paperback formats. In April 1998 it was republished in mass market paperback format. The White Abacus won the 1997 Aurealis Award for best science fiction novel and the 1998 Ditmar Award for best Australian long fiction.

References

External links

1997 novels
1997 science fiction novels
Australian science fiction novels
Aurealis Award-winning works
HarperCollins books